The 2008 Astro Wah Lai Toi Drama Awards, presented by Astro in Malaysia, was an awards ceremony that recognised the best Hong Kong television programmes that had aired on Malaysia's Astro Wah Lai Toi in 2008. The ceremony was televised live on Astro's Cantonese channel, Astro Wah Lai Toi.

The ceremony took place on 21 February 2009 at the Arena of Stars in Kuala Lumpur, Malaysia. Winners were 100% based on results from popular vote. The voting period lasted from 17 January 2009 to 17 February 2009.

The biggest winner was Heart of Greed, winning nine awards including My Favourite Actor, My Favourite Actress, and My Favourite Drama.

Winners and nominees
Top five nominees are in bold.

References

TVB original programming
2009 television awards
2009 in Malaysian television
2009 in Hong Kong television
Genting Highlands

zh:Astro华丽台电视剧大奖2008